Team Ljubljana Gusto Santic is a Slovenian cycling team founded in 1949, which has competed as a UCI Continental team since 2005. It participates in UCI Continental Circuits races.

Team roster

Major wins

2005
Stage 1 Istrian Spring Trophy, Jure Kocjan
2006
 Time Trial Championships, Kristjan Fajt
Stage 6 Tour de Slovaquie, Matic Strgar
Tour of Vojvodina, Jure Kocjan
Trofeo Bianchin, Matic Strgar
2007
Beograd-Banja Luka I, Matej Gnezda
GP Kooperativa, Kristjan Fajt
2008
Cronoscalata Gardone Valtrompia, Robert Vrečer
Giro del Medio Brenta, Robert Vrečer
Ljubljana–Zagreb, Robert Vrečer
Kroz Vojvodina I, Robert Vrečer
Trofeo Bianchin, Robert Vrečer
2009
Overall Istrian Spring Trophy, Mitja Mahorič
Stage 4 The Paths of King Nikola, Bostjan Rezman
2010
 Time Trial Championships, Matija Kvasina
Gran Premio della Liberazione, Jan Tratnik
Overall Coupe des Nations Ville de Saguenay, Luka Mezgec
2012
Piccolo Giro di Lombardia, Jan Polanc
2013
 Road Race Championships, Luka Pibernik
Overall Giro del Friuli-Venezia Giulia, Jan Polanc
Stage 4, Jan Polanc
Stage 2 Czech Cycling Tour, Luka Pibernik
2014
Banja Luka–Belgrad I, Martin Otoničar
2016
Stage 5 Tour de Hongrie, Rok Korošec
2017
Stage 2 Tour de Hongrie, Žiga Jerman
2018
Gent–Wevelgem Juniors, Žiga Jerman
Overall Giro della Regione Friuli Venezia Giulia, Tadej Pogačar
2019
Stage 3 Tour of Japan, Ben Hill
2021
 Road Race Championships, Viktor Potočki
2021
 Criterium Championships, Carlo Jurisevic

National Champions
2006
 Slovenia Time Trial, Kristjan Fajt
2010
 Croatia Time Trial, Matija Kvasina
2013
 Slovenia Road Race, Luka Pibernik
2021
 Croatia Road Race, Viktor Potočki
2021
 Croatia Criterium, Carlo Jurisevic

References

External links

UCI Continental Teams (Europe)
Cycling teams established in 1949
Cycling teams based in Slovenia
1949 establishments in Slovenia